Geetbets is a municipality located in the Belgian province of Flemish Brabant. The municipality comprises the towns of Geetbets proper, Grazen and Rummen. On January 1, 2006, Geetbets had a total population of 5,765. The total area is 35.17 km2 which gives a population density of 164 inhabitants per km2.

Notable people
Jane Brigode (born Jane Ouwerx) (Rummen, 30 May 1870-Forest, 3 May 1952), a Belgian liberal and politician.

References

External links
 

Municipalities of Flemish Brabant